Lateralis may refer to:
 Vastus lateralis muscle, the largest part of the Quadriceps femoris

See also
 Lateralus, an album by Tool